The  are electric multiple unit (EMU) train types operated in Japan on limited express services by the private railway operator Tobu Railway since 1991. The trains are used on Ryōmō services from Asakusa in Tokyo to Akagi and Kuzū.

Formations
, the fleet consists of nine 6-car 200 series sets and one 6-car 250 series set.

200 series sets 201 to 209

Cars 2, 4, and 5 are each fitted with a pantograph (scissors type on sets 201 to 206, and single-arm type on sets 207 to 209.

250 series set 251

Car 2 is fitted with one single-arm pantograph, and car 4 is fitted with two single-arm pantographs.

Interior
Seats in the 200 series sets were reused from former 1700 and 1720 series trainsets, with new seat cover moquette. Vending machines selling drinks are provided onboard.

History
The first seven 200 series sets were built between 1991 and 1996 utilizing the bogies and traction motors from former 1700/1720 series "DRC" EMUs displaced by the arrival of new Spacia 100 series EMUs. The trains entered service from 1 February 1991. Sets 208 and 209 built in fiscal 1997 featured HID headlights, LED destination indicators, and single-arm pantographs. 250 series set 251, was an entirely new build, delivered in March 1998. This featured the same 190 kW traction motors and bogies as the 30000 series, with VVVF control. Only three of the six cars in this set are motored.

In December 2014, set 206 was overhauled and returned to traffic with new seats, replacing the original 1700/1720 series seating.

Livery variations

Puyuma Express 
In June 2016, 200 series set 208 was repainted in a special livery based on that of the Puyuma Express trains operated in Taiwan by the Taiwan Railways Administration (TRA). This follows the signing of a friendship agreement between Tobu and TRA in December 2015.

Revival livery 
On 5 August 2021, 200 series set 205 was repainted in a livery based on that of the 1800 series trainsets. In addition, its seat covers were changed to resemble those of the 1800 series. Set 209 was repainted in the same livery on 8 February 2022.

References

External links

 Tobu 200 series information 

Electric multiple units of Japan
200 series
Train-related introductions in 1991
Alna Koki rolling stock
Tokyu Car multiple units
1500 V DC multiple units of Japan